M. Roma Volley is an Italian volleyball club playing in the Italian Volleyball League. 
The club was founded in 2006. It currently plays in the Italian Serie A1 (Italy's top division).

Italian volleyball clubs
Volleyball in Rome
Volleyball clubs established in 2006
Sports clubs in Rome
2006 establishments in Italy